Annika Loske (born 17 May 1998) is a German sprint canoeist.

She participated at the 2018 ICF Canoe Sprint World Championships.

References

External links

German female canoeists
ICF Canoe Sprint World Championships medalists in Canadian
1998 births
Living people
20th-century German women
21st-century German women